Puget may refer to:

Puget (surname)
Puget, Vaucluse, a commune in France
Puget, Washington, a community in the United States

See also
Puget Creek
Puget Island
Puget Sound
Puget-Ville